Combat Logistics Regiment 1 (CLR 1) is a logistics regiment of the United States Marine Corps.  The unit is based out of the Marine Corps Base Camp Pendleton, California and falls under the command of the 1st Marine Logistics Group and the I Marine Expeditionary Force (I MEF).

Mission
To provide logistics support to the 1st Marine Division beyond its organic capabilities in any environment and throughout the spectrum of conflict in order to allow the division to continue operations independent of any logistically driven operational pauses.

Subordinate units
 Combat Logistics Battalion 1
 Combat Logistics Battalion 5
 Combat Logistics Battalion 7
 1st Transportation Battalion
 1st Landing Support Battalion

History

See also

 List of United States Marine Corps regiments
 Organization of the United States Marine Corps

References
Notes

Web

 CLR-1's official website

Combat logistics regiments of the United States Marine Corps